Frank Shively was an American football coach.  He served as the head football coach at Washington Agricultural College and School of Science—now known as Washington State University—from 1898 to 1899, compiling a record of 1–1–1.  Shively was a Native American of the Crow tribe.  He was a graduate of the Carlisle Indian Industrial School.  While he coached at Washington State, Shively worked as a stenographer at the Nez Perce Indian agency in Lapwai, Idaho.

Head coaching record

References

Year of birth missing
Year of death missing
Washington State Cougars football coaches
Carlisle Indian Industrial School alumni
Crow people
Native American sportspeople
People from Lapwai, Idaho